Émile-Félix Gautier or Gauthier (19 October 1864 – 16 January 1940) was a French geographer.

Gautier was born in Clermont-Ferrand.  His studies focused on northern Africa, especially Algeria, the Sahara desert and the territories of French Africa. He also conducted research in the French colony of Madagascar. He died, aged 75, in Pontivy (Saint-Pierre-de-Quiberon).

During his career, he taught classes at the École supérieure des lettres in Algiers, and was also a director of education in Madagascar. In 1922 he became a member of the Académie des sciences d'outre-mer.

Works 
 Madagascar : essai de géographie physique (1902) – Madagascar, essay of physical geography.
 Études d’ethnographie saharienne, l’Anthropologie XVIII, 1907 – Studies of Saharan ethnography.
 L’Algérie et la métropole, 1920 – Algeria and the metropolis.
 Les Territoires du Sud. Description géographique, Gouvernement Général de l’Algérie, 1922 – The territories of the south, a geographical description.
 Le Sahara (1923: translated as "Sahara, the Great Desert" by Dorothy Ford Mayhew, 1935).
 L’Islamisation de l’Afrique du Nord. Les siècles obscurs du Moghreb, 1927 – Islamization of North Africa. Dark Ages of the Magreb.
 Un Siècle de colonisation (1930) – A century of colonization.
 Le Monument de Tin Hinan (Annales de l’Académie des sciences coloniales) t. VII, 1934 (with Maurice Reygasse).
 L'Afrique blanche (1939) – White Africa.
 Missions au Sahara (with René Chudeau)

References

External links 
 Bibliography (PDF, in French)

1864 births
1940 deaths
French geographers
French ethnographers
Scientists from Clermont-Ferrand